Tom McIntosh (born 1927) is an American jazz trombonist, composer, arranger and conductor.

Tom McIntosh may also refer to:

Tom McIntosh (comedian) (1840–1904), African-American comedian who starred in Callender's Georgia Minstrels
Tom McIntosh (soccer) (born 1966), head men's soccer coach at the University of Tulsa
Tom McIntosh (politician), Australian politician and member of the Victorian Legislative Council
Thomas H. McIntosh (1879–1935), secretary manager of Darlington, Middlesbrough and Everton football club